Bangabandhu ('Friend of Bengal') is a popular title of Sheikh Mujibur Rahman (1920–1975), a Bangladeshi politician and statesman. 

Bangabandhu may also refer to:

Bangabandhu Satellite-1, a Bangladeshi communications and broadcasting satellite
Bangabandhu Cup, an international football tournament
Bangladesh Air Force Base Bangabandhu at Shahjalal International Airport
Bangabandhu, working name of the film named "Mujib: The Making of a Nation"

See also

List of things named after Sheikh Mujibur Rahman